Pobre negro is a Venezuelan telenovela produced by RCTV in 1989 based on a novel of the same name written by Rómulo Gallegos. This version was adapted by Gustavo Michelena and starred Franklin Virgüez and Marlene Maseda.

Plot
Pedro Miguel, referred to as "Negro Malo" is a slave working at a cocoa plantation in Venezuela in the 19th century and he gets into a stormy relationship with Ana Julia Alcorta, the daughter of the hacienda owner where he works. Within the framework of the forthcoming Federal War, and the future movement for the liberation of slaves, a story full of magic and hope unfolds, which tells us of the struggles against injustice and submission.

Cast
Franklin Virgüez as  Negro Malo / Pedro Miguel Candelas
Marlene Maseda as Ana Julia Alcorta
Abby Raymond
Gledys Ibarra as Encarnación
Carlos Cámara Jr. as Cecilio Césperes "El Viejo"
Hazel Leal as Candelaria
Ignacio Navarro as Don Carlos Alcorta
Carlos Villamizar as Rosendo Mediavilla
Tomás Henríquez
América Barrios
Alberto Álvarez as Mendonga
Jenny Noguera
Pedro Marthan
Elisa Escámez
Lorenzo Henríquez
Antonio Machuca
Gisvel Ascanio
Pedro Durán
Evelyn Berroterán
Marco Antonio Casanova
Estrella Castellanos
Vladimir Torres
Reina Hinojosa
Diego Acuña

References

External links

Pobre negro Opening credits

1989 telenovelas
RCTV telenovelas
Venezuelan telenovelas
1989 Venezuelan television series debuts
1989 Venezuelan television series endings